Horohoro may refer to:

Horohoro, a fictional character in the anime and manga series Shaman King
Horohoro, New Zealand, a farming district 15 kilometres (9.3 mi) south-west of Rotorua.
Mount Horohoro, a mountain in Hokkaidō, Japan.